Carnival is a festive season occurring immediately before Lent. 

Carnival, carnaval or The Carnival may also refer to:

Festivals and entertainment
Caribbean Carnival, carnivals with origins in Caribbean culture that occur across the World
Traveling carnival, an amusement show typically including rides, games, etc.

Transport
Carnival Cruise Line
Carnival Corporation & plc, the parent company of Carnival Cruise Line
Kia Carnival, a minivan
SS Carnivale, a steamship operating 1975-1993

Literature
Carnival (Mackenzie novel), a 1912 novel by Compton Mackenzie
Carnival (Antoni novel), a 2005 novel by Robert Antoni
Carnival (Bear novel), a 2006 science fiction novel by Elizabeth Bear
"The Carnival" (short story), a 1980 short story by Michael Fedo
"Carnival! Carnival!", a poem by Patti Smith in her 1978 book Babel

Film and television

Film
The Carnival (film), a 1911 short film
Carnival (1921 film), a British silent drama
Carnival (1931 film), a British drama
Carnival (1935 film), an American film
Carnival (1946 film), a British drama
Carnival (1981 film), a Russian romantic comedy
Carnival (1989 film), a Malayalam film
Karnaval, a 1999 French film
Carnivale, a 1999 French animated film by Millimages
The Carnival, a 1984 Telugu documentary by B. Narsing Rao

Television
Carnivàle, a 2003-2005 American TV series 
"Carnival" (Bottom), a television episode
"Carnival", a season 1 episode of The Bellflower Bunnies
"Carnival", a 1997 episode of the series Teletubbies
"Carnaval", a 2018 episode of the series Mickey Mouse
"Carnival", a Malcolm in the Middle episode from season 2 (2001)

Performing arts
Carnival!, a stage musical
The Carnival (play), a 1664 comedy by Thomas Porter
Carnaval (ballet)
Carnival Center for the Performing Arts

Other uses
Carnival (video game)
Carnival Food Stores

Music
Carnival Records

Classical music
Carnaval (Schumann), an 1834–1835 set of piano pieces by Robert Schumann
Carnival Overture (Dvořák), Op. 92, an 1891 concert overture by Antonín Dvořák
Carnival, a c. 1934 composition by John Foulds

Performers
The Carnival (band), a 1960s American pop group
The Carnival Band (Canadian band), a Canadian marching band
The Carnival Band (folk group), an English band
Karnivool, an Australian progressive rock band

Albums
Carnaval (Barão Vermelho album) or the title song, 1988
Carnaval (Ron Carter album), 1983; by Ron Carter, Hank Jones, Satao Watanabe, and Tony Williams, recorded in 1978
Carnaval (Spyro Gyra album) or the title song, 1980
Carnaval, by Wynton Marsalis and the Eastman Wind Ensemble, 1987
Carnaval, by Zelda, 1983
Carnival (Kasey Chambers album), 2006
Carnival (John Handy album) or the title song, 1977
Carnival (Maynard Ferguson album), 1978
Carnival (New Model Army album), 2005
Carnival (Randy Weston album) or the title song, 1975
Carnival, by Bryce Vine, 2019
Wyclef Jean Presents The Carnival or the title song, 1997
The Carnival, self-titled album by The Carnival, 1969

EPs
Carnival (B.A.P. EP) or the title song, 2016
Carnival (Duran Duran EP), 1982
Carnival, by Bvndit, 2020

Songs
"Carnaval" (song), by Maluma, 2014
"Carnaval", by Claudia Leitte featuring Pitbull, 2018
"Carnaval", by Santana from Festival, 1977
"Carnival" (The Cardigans song), 1995
"Carnival" (Ch!pz song), 2005
"Carnival" (Eric Clapton song), 1977
"Carnival" (Natalie Merchant song), 1995
"Manhã de Carnaval" ("Carnival Morning"), written by Luiz Bonfá and Antônio Maria; covered by several performers as "Carnival", an English-language version
"Sobre las olas" ("Over the Waves"), written by Juventino Rosas; covered by the Beach Boys as "Carnival (Over the Waves)" 
"Carnival", by Bikini Kill from Revolution Girl Style Now, 1991
"Carnival", by Gorillaz from Humanz, 2017
"Carnival", by Our Lady Peace from Clumsy, 1997
"Carnival", by the Pillows, 1999

See also

Carnevale (disambiguation)
Karneval (disambiguation)